Dau or DAU may refer to:

Dau (surname)
Dau (film), a biography of physicist Lev Landau
DAU (project), a cross-sectional cinema and art project
Da'u County, or Dawu County, in Sichuan, China
Defense Acquisition University, a university under the United States Department of Defense located in Fort Belvoir, Virginia
Club Deportivo Árabe Unido
Daily active users, a performance metric for the success of an Internet product
Dau, a barangay in Mabalacat, Pampanga, Philippines
Dauair, a small, short-lived German airline (ICAO code: DAU)